Eutypa is a genus of fungi in the family Diatrypaceae. The widespread genus is estimated to contain 32 species. Anamorphic forms include the genera Libertella and Cytosporina. The genus was circumscribed in 1863 by the French mycologists and brothers Louis and Charles Tulasne.

Species
Eutypa acerina
Eutypa aspera
Eutypa astroidea
Eutypa bathurstensis
Eutypa crustata
Eutypa flavovirens
Eutypa hydnoidea
Eutypa laevata
Eutypa lata
Eutypa leioplaca
Eutypa leptoplaca
Eutypa ludibunda
Eutypa maura
Eutypa polycocca
Eutypa prorumpens
Eutypa quercicola
Eutypa scabrosa
Eutypa sparsa
Eutypa spinosa
Eutypa subtecta
Eutypa tetragona
Eutypa ulicis
Eutypa velutina

References

Sordariomycetes genera
Xylariales